

Events

Pre-1600
337 – Constantine II, Constantius II, and Constans succeed their father Constantine I as co-emperors. The Roman Empire is divided between the three Augusti.
1000 – Battle of Svolder, Viking Age.
1141 – Yelü Dashi, the Liao dynasty general who founded the Qara Khitai, defeats the Seljuq and Kara-Khanid forces at the Battle of Qatwan.
1320 – In the Battle of Saint George, the Byzantines under Andronikos Asen ambush and defeat the forces of the Principality of Achaea, securing possession of Arcadia.
1488 – Anne becomes sovereign Duchess of Brittany, becoming a central figure in the struggle for influence that leads to the union of Brittany and France.
1493 – Battle of Krbava Field, a decisive defeat of Croats in Croatian struggle against the invasion by the Ottoman Empire.
  1493   – Christopher Columbus, with 17 ships and 1,200 men, sails on second voyage from Cadiz.
1499 – The citizens of Lisbon celebrate the triumphal return of the explorer Vasco de Gama, completing his two-year journey around the Cape of Good Hope to India.
1513 – James IV of Scotland is defeated and dies in the Battle of Flodden, ending Scotland's involvement in the War of the League of Cambrai.
1543 – Mary Stuart, at nine months old, is crowned "Queen of Scots" in the central Scottish town of Stirling.
1561 – The ultimately unsuccessful Colloquy of Poissy opens in an effort to reconcile French Catholics and Protestants.
1588 – Thomas Cavendish in his ship [[Desire (ship)|Desire]] enters Plymouth and completes the first deliberately planned voyage of circumnavigation.
1601–1900
1739 – Stono Rebellion, the largest slave uprising in Britain's mainland North American colonies prior to the American Revolution, erupts near Charleston, South Carolina.
1776 – The Continental Congress officially names its union of states the United States.
1791 – Washington, D.C., the capital of the United States, is named after President George Washington.
1801 – Alexander I of Russia confirms the privileges of Baltic provinces.
1839 – John Herschel takes the first glass plate photograph.
1845 – Possible start of the Great Famine of Ireland.
1850 – The Compromise of 1850 transfers a third of Texas's claimed territory to federal control in return for the U.S. federal government assuming $10 million of Texas's pre-annexation debt. 
1850 – California is admitted as the thirty-first U.S. state.
1855 – Crimean War: The Siege of Sevastopol comes to an end when Russian forces abandon the city.
1863 – American Civil War: The Union Army enters Chattanooga, Tennessee.
1892 – Amalthea, third closest and fifth found moon of Jupiter is discovered by Edward Emerson Barnard.

1901–present
1914 – World War I: The creation of the Canadian Automobile Machine Gun Brigade, the first fully mechanized unit in the British Army.
1922 – The Greco-Turkish War effectively ends with Turkish victory over the Greeks in Smyrna.
1923 – Mustafa Kemal Atatürk, the founder of the Republic of Turkey, founds the Republican People's Party.
1924 – Hanapepe massacre occurs on Kauai, Hawaii.
1936 – The crews of Portuguese Navy frigate  and destroyer Dão mutinied against the Salazar dictatorship's support of General Franco's coup and declared their solidarity with the Spanish Republic.
1939 – World War II: The Battle of Hel begins, the longest-defended pocket of Polish Army resistance during the German invasion of Poland.
  1939   – Burmese national hero U Ottama dies in prison after a hunger strike to protest Britain's colonial government.
1940 – George Stibitz pioneers the first remote operation of a computer.
  1940   – Treznea Massacre in Transylvania.
1942 – World War II: A Japanese floatplane drops incendiary bombs on Oregon.
1943 – World War II: The Allies land at Salerno and Taranto, Italy.
1944 – World War II: The Fatherland Front takes power in Bulgaria through a military coup in the capital and armed rebellion in the country. A new pro-Soviet government is established.
1945 – Second Sino-Japanese War: The Empire of Japan formally surrenders to China.
1947 – First case of a computer bug being found: A moth lodges in a relay of a Harvard Mark II computer at Harvard University.
1948 – Kim Il-sung declares the establishment of the Democratic People's Republic of Korea (North Korea).
1954 – The 6.7  Chlef earthquake shakes northern Algeria with a maximum Mercalli intensity of XI (Extreme). At least 1,243 people were killed and 5,000 were injured.
1956 – Elvis Presley appears on The Ed Sullivan Show for the first time.
1965 – The United States Department of Housing and Urban Development is established.
  1965   – Hurricane Betsy makes its second landfall near New Orleans, leaving 76 dead and $1.42 billion ($10–12 billion in 2005 dollars) in damages, becoming the first hurricane to cause over $1 billion in unadjusted damage.
1966 – The National Traffic and Motor Vehicle Safety Act is signed into law by U.S. President Lyndon B. Johnson.
1969 – In Canada, the Official Languages Act comes into force, making French equal to English throughout the Federal government.
  1969   – Allegheny Airlines Flight 863 collides in mid-air with a Piper PA-28 Cherokee over Moral Township, Shelby County, Indiana, killing all 83 people on board both aircraft.
1970 – A British airliner is hijacked by the Popular Front for the Liberation of Palestine and flown to Dawson's Field in Jordan.
1971 – The four-day Attica Prison riot begins, eventually resulting in 39 dead, most killed by state troopers retaking the prison.
1972 – In Kentucky's Mammoth Cave National Park, a Cave Research Foundation exploration and mapping team discovers a link between the Mammoth and Flint Ridge cave systems, making it the longest known cave passageway in the world.
1990 – Batticaloa massacre: Massacre of 184 Tamil civilians by the Sri Lankan Army in Batticaloa District.
1991 – Tajikistan declares independence from the Soviet Union.
1993 – Israeli–Palestinian peace process: The Palestine Liberation Organization officially recognizes Israel as a legitimate state.
1994 – Space Shuttle program: Space Shuttle Discovery is launched on STS-64.
2001 – Ahmad Shah Massoud, leader of the Northern Alliance, is assassinated in Afghanistan by two al-Qaeda assassins who claimed to be Arab journalists wanting an interview.
2009 – The Dubai Metro, the first urban train network in the Arabian Peninsula, is ceremonially inaugurated.
2012 – The Indian space agency puts into orbit its heaviest foreign satellite yet, in a streak of 21 consecutive successful PSLV launches.
  2012   – A wave of attacks kills more than 100 people and injure 350 others across Iraq. 
2015 – Elizabeth II becomes the longest reigning monarch of the United Kingdom.
2016 – The government of North Korea conducts its fifth and reportedly biggest nuclear test. World leaders condemn the act, with South Korea calling it "maniacal recklessness".

Births
Pre-1600
 214/15 – Aurelian, Roman emperor (d. 275)
 384 – Honorius, Roman emperor (d. 423)
1349 – Albert III, Duke of Austria (d. 1395)
1427 – Thomas de Ros, 9th Baron de Ros, English soldier and politician (d. 1464)
1466 – Ashikaga Yoshitane, Japanese shōgun (d. 1523)
1558 – Philippe Emmanuel, Duke of Mercœur (d. 1602)
1585 – Cardinal Richelieu, French cardinal and politician (d. 1642)
1601–1900
1629 – Cornelis Tromp, Dutch general (d. 1691)
1700 – Princess Anna Sophie of Schwarzburg-Rudolstadt (d. 1780)
1711 – Thomas Hutchinson, English historian and politician, Governor of the Province of Massachusetts Bay (d. 1780)
1721 – Fredrik Henrik af Chapman, Swedish admiral and shipbuilder (d. 1808)
1731 – Francisco Javier Clavijero, Mexican priest, historian, and scholar (d. 1787)
1737 – Luigi Galvani, Italian physician and physicist (d. 1798)
1754 – William Bligh, English admiral and politician, 4th Governor of New South Wales (d. 1817)
1755 – Benjamin Bourne, American judge and politician (d. 1808)
1777 – James Carr, American soldier and politician (d. 1818)
1778 – Clemens Brentano, German poet and author (d. 1842)
1789 – Menachem Mendel Schneersohn, Polish rabbi (d. 1866)
1807 – Richard Chenevix Trench, Irish-English archbishop and philologist (d. 1886)
1823 – Joseph Leidy, American paleontologist and academic (d. 1891)
1828 – Leo Tolstoy, Russian author and playwright (d. 1910)
1834 – Joseph Henry Shorthouse, English author (d. 1903)
1853 – Fred Spofforth, Australian-English cricketer and merchant (d. 1926)
1855 – Houston Stewart Chamberlain, English-German philosopher and author (d. 1927)
1863 – Herbert Henry Ball, English-Canadian journalist and politician (d. 1943)
1868 – Mary Hunter Austin, American author, poet, and critic (d. 1934)
1873 – Max Reinhardt, Austrian-born American theater and film director (d. 1943)
1876 – Frank Chance, American baseball player and manager (d. 1924)
1877 – James Agate, English journalist, author, and critic (d. 1947)
1878 – Adelaide Crapsey, American poet and critic (d. 1914)
  1878   – Arthur Fox, English-American fencer (d. 1958)
  1878   – Sergio Osmeña, Filipino lawyer and politician, 4th President of the Philippines (d. 1961)
1882 – Clem McCarthy, American sportscaster (d. 1962)
1885 – Miriam Licette, English soprano and educator (d. 1969)
1887 – Alf Landon, American lieutenant, banker, and politician, 26th Governor of Kansas (d. 1987)
1890 – Colonel Sanders, American businessman, founded KFC (d. 1980)
1894 – Arthur Freed, American composer and producer (d. 1973)
  1894   – Humphrey Mitchell, Canadian trade union leader and politician, 14th Canadian Minister of Labour (d. 1950)
  1894   – Bert Oldfield, Australian cricketer and soldier (d. 1976)
1898 – Frankie Frisch, American baseball player and manager (d. 1973)
1899 – Neil Hamilton, American stage, film and television actor (d. 1984)
  1899   – Waite Hoyt, American baseball player and sportscaster (d. 1984)
  1899   – Bruno E. Jacob, American academic, founded the National Forensic League (d. 1979)
1900 – James Hilton, English-American author and screenwriter (d. 1954)

1901–present
1903 – Lev Shankovsky, Ukrainian military historian (d. 1995)
  1903   – Edward Upward, English author (d. 2009)
  1903   – Phyllis A. Whitney, American author (d. 2008)
1904 – Feroze Khan, Indian-Pakistani field hockey player and coach (d. 2005)
  1904   – Arthur Laing, Canadian lawyer and politician, 9th Canadian Minister of Veterans Affairs (d. 1975)
1905 – Joseph E. Levine, American film producer, founded Embassy Pictures (d. 1987)
  1905   – Brahmarishi Hussain Sha, Indian philosopher and poet (d. 1981)
1906 – Ali Hadi Bara, Iranian-Turkish sculptor and educator (d. 1971)
1907 – Leon Edel, American author and critic (d. 1997)
1908 – Cesare Pavese, Italian poet and author (d. 1950)
  1908   – Shigekazu Shimazaki, Japanese admiral (d. 1945)
1911 – Paul Goodman, American author, poet, and playwright (d. 1972)
  1911   – John Gorton, Australian lieutenant and politician, 19th Prime Minister of Australia (d. 2002)
1914 – John Passmore, Australian philosopher and academic (d. 2004)
1918 – Oscar Luigi Scalfaro, Italian lawyer and politician, 9th President of Italy (d. 2012)
1919 – Gottfried Dienst, Swiss footballer and referee (d. 1998)
  1919   – Jimmy Snyder, American sportscaster (d. 1996)
1920 – Neil Chotem, Canadian pianist, composer, and conductor (d. 2008)
  1920   – Feng Kang, Chinese mathematician and physicist (d. 1993)
  1920   – Robert Wood Johnson III, American businessman and philanthropist (d. 1970)
1922 – Hoyt Curtin, American composer and producer (d. 2000)
  1922   – Hans Georg Dehmelt, German-American physicist and academic, Nobel Prize laureate (d. 2017)
  1922   – Manolis Glezos, Greek journalist and politician (d. 2020)
  1922   – Warwick Estevam Kerr, Brazilian geneticist, entomologist, and engineer (d. 2018)
1923 – Daniel Carleton Gajdusek, American physician and academic, Nobel Prize laureate (d. 2008)
  1923   – Cliff Robertson, American actor (d. 2011)
1924 – Jane Greer, American actress (d. 2001)
  1924   – Sylvia Miles, American actress (d. 2019)
  1924   – Russell M. Nelson, American captain, surgeon, and religious leader
  1924   – Rik Van Steenbergen, Belgian cyclist (d. 2003)
1926 – Louise Abeita, Isleta Pueblo (Native American) writer, poet, and educator (d. 2014)
  1926   – Yusuf al-Qaradawi, Egyptian theologian and author (d. 2022)
1927 – Elvin Jones, American drummer and bandleader (d. 2004)
  1927   – Tatyana Zaslavskaya, Russian sociologist and economist (d. 2013)
1928 – Moses Anderson, American Roman Catholic bishop (d. 2013)
  1928   – Sol LeWitt, American painter and sculptor (d. 2007)
1929 – Claude Nougaro, French singer-songwriter (d. 2004)
1930 – Francis Carroll, Australian archbishop
1931 – Robin Hyman, English author and publisher (d. 2017)
  1931   – Zoltán Latinovits, Hungarian actor and author (d. 1976)
  1931   – Ida Mae Martinez, American wrestler (d. 2010)
  1931   – Shirley Summerskill, English physician and politician
  1931   – Margaret Tyzack, English actress (d. 2011)
1932 – Carm Lino Spiteri, Maltese architect and politician (d. 2008)
1934 – Nicholas Liverpool, Dominican lawyer and politician, 6th President of Dominica (d. 2015)
  1934   – Sonia Sanchez, American poet, playwright, and activist
1935 – Gopal Baratham, Singaporean neurosurgeon and author (d. 2002)
  1935   – Nadim Sawalha, Jordanian-born English actor
  1935   – Chaim Topol, Israeli actor, singer, and producer (d. 2023) 
1936 – William Bradshaw, Baron Bradshaw, English academic and politician
1938 – John Davis, English anthropologist and academic
  1938   – Jay Ward, American baseball player, coach, and manager (d. 2012)
1939 – Ron McDole, American football player
1940 – Hugh Morgan, Australian businessman
  1940   – Joe Negroni, American doo-wop singer (d. 1978)
1941 – Syed Abid Ali, Indian cricketer
  1941   – Otis Redding, American singer-songwriter and producer (d. 1967)
  1941   – Dennis Ritchie, American computer scientist, created the C programming language (d. 2011)
1942 – Inez Foxx, American singer
  1942   – Danny Kalb, American singer and guitarist
1943 – Frank Clark, English footballer, manager and chairman
1945 – Ton van Heugten, Dutch motocross racer (d. 2008)
  1945   – Dee Dee Sharp, American singer
  1945   – Doug Ingle, American singer-songwriter and keyboard player
1946 – Jim Keays, Scottish-Australian singer-songwriter (d. 2014)
  1946   – Bruce Palmer, Canadian folk-rock bass player (d. 2004)
1947 – David Rosenboom, American composer and educator
  1947   – Freddy Weller, American singer-songwriter and guitarist
  1947   – T. M. Wright, American author, poet, and illustrator (d. 2015)
1949 – John Curry, English figure skater (d. 1994)
  1949   – Daniel Pipes, American historian and author
  1949   – Joe Theismann, American football player and sportscaster
  1949   – Susilo Bambang Yudhoyono, Indonesian general and politician, 6th President of Indonesia
1950 – Gogi Alauddin, Pakistani squash player and coach
  1950   – John McFee, American singer-songwriter, guitarist, and producer
1951 – Alexander Downer, Australian economist and politician, 34th Minister of Foreign Affairs for Australia
  1951   – Tom Wopat, American actor and singer 
1952 – Angela Cartwright, English-born American actress, author, and singer
  1952   – Per Jørgensen, Norwegian singer and trumpet player
  1952   – Dave Stewart, English singer-songwriter, guitarist, and producer
1953 – Janet Fielding, Australian actress
1955 – John Kricfalusi, Canadian voice actor, animator, director, and screenwriter
1957 – Pierre-Laurent Aimard, French pianist and educator
1959 – Tom Foley, American baseball player and coach
  1959   – Éric Serra, French composer and producer
1960 – Hugh Grant, English actor and producer
  1960   – Bob Hartley, Canadian ice hockey player and coach
  1960   – Johnson Righeira, Italian singer-songwriter, musician, record producer and actor
  1960   – Bob Stoops, American football player and coach
  1960   – Kimberly Willis Holt, American author
1963 – Chris Coons, American lawyer and politician
  1963   – Roberto Donadoni, Italian footballer and manager
  1963   – Neil Fairbrother, English cricketer
1964 – Aleksandar Hemon, Bosnian-American author and critic
  1964   – Skip Kendall, American golfer
1965 – Dan Majerle, American basketball player and coach
  1965   – Marcel Peeper, Dutch footballer
1966 – Georg Hackl, German luger and coach
  1966   – Kevin Hatcher, American ice hockey player
  1966   – Adam Sandler, American actor, screenwriter, and producer
  1966   – Brian Smith, Australian-Irish rugby player and coach 
1967 – B. J. Armstrong, American basketball player and sportscaster
  1967   – Chris Caffery, American singer-songwriter and guitarist
  1967   – Mark Shrader, American wrestler
  1967   – Akshay Kumar, Canadian actor and producer
1968 – Jon Drummond, American sprinter and coach
  1968   – Clive Mendonca, English footballer
  1968   – Julia Sawalha, English actress
1969 – Rachel Hunter, New Zealand model and actress
  1969   – Natasha Stott Despoja, Australian politician
1970 – Natalia Streignard, Spanish-Venezuelan actress
1971 – Eric Stonestreet, American actor
  1971   – Henry Thomas, American actor and guitarist
1972 – Mike Hampton, American baseball player and coach
  1972   – Natasha Kaplinsky, English journalist
  1972   – Jakko Jan Leeuwangh, Dutch speed skater
  1972   – Miriam Oremans, Dutch tennis player
  1972   – Xavi Pascual, Spanish professional basketball coach
  1972   – Félix Rodríguez, Dominican baseball player
  1972   – Goran Višnjić, Croatian-American actor
1973 – Kazuhisa Ishii, Japanese baseball player
1974 – Vikram Batra, Indian captain (d. 1999)
  1974   – Shane Crawford, Australian footballer and television host
  1974   – Marcos Curiel, American singer-songwriter, guitarist, and producer 
  1974   – Jun Kasai, Japanese wrestler
  1974   – Gok Wan, English fashion stylist, author, and television host
1975 – Michael Bublé, Canadian singer-songwriter and actor
  1975   – Anton Oliver, New Zealand rugby player
1976 – Emma de Caunes, French actress
  1976   – El Intocable, Mexican wrestler
  1976   – Hanno Möttölä, Finnish basketball player
  1976   – Joey Newman, American composer and conductor
  1976   – Aki Riihilahti, Finnish footballer and coach
  1976   – Kristoffer Rygg, Norwegian singer-songwriter and producer 
1977 – Kyle Snyder, American baseball player and coach
  1977   – Fatih Tekke, Turkish footballer and manager
1978 – Kurt Ainsworth, American baseball player and businessman, co-founded Marucci Sports
  1978   – Shane Battier, American basketball player and sportscaster
1979 – Wayne Carlisle, Northern Irish footballer and coach
  1979   – Nikki DeLoach, American actress and singer 
1980 – Todd Coffey, American baseball player
  1980   – Václav Drobný, Czech footballer (d. 2012)
  1980   – David Fa'alogo, New Zealand rugby league player
  1980   – Michelle Williams, American actress 
1981 – Julie Gonzalo, Argentine-American actress
1982 – John Kuhn, American football player
  1982   – Graham Onions, English cricketer
  1982   – Ai Otsuka, Japanese singer-songwriter, pianist, and actress 
  1982   – Eugênio Rômulo Togni, Brazilian footballer
1983 – Vitolo, Spanish footballer
  1983   – Kyle Davies, American baseball player
  1983   – Edwin Jackson, American baseball player
  1983   – Cleveland Taylor, English footballer
1984 – Jaouad Akaddar, Moroccan footballer (d. 2012)
  1984   – Brad Guzan, American soccer player
  1984   – James Hildreth, English cricketer
  1984   – Michalis Sifakis, Greek footballer
1985 – Lior Eliyahu, Israeli basketball player
  1985   – Martin Johnson, American singer-songwriter, guitarist, and producer 
  1985   – Luka Modrić, Croatian footballer
  1985   – J. R. Smith, American basketball player
1986 – Michael Bowden, American baseball player
  1986   – Chamu Chibhabha, Zimbabwean cricketer
  1986   – Luc Mbah a Moute, Cameroonian basketball player
  1986   – Keith Yandle, American hockey player
1987 – Markus Jürgenson, Estonian footballer
  1987   – Alexis Palisson, French rugby player
  1987   – Andrea Petkovic, German tennis player
  1987   – Afrojack, Dutch-Surinamese DJ, record producer, and remixer
1988 – Danilo D'Ambrosio, Italian footballer
  1988   – Will Middlebrooks, American baseball player
1989 – Alfonzo Dennard, American football player
  1989   – Casey Hayward, American football player
1990 – Shaun Johnson, New Zealand rugby league player
  1990   – Haley Reinhart, American singer-songwriter and actress
  1990   – Andrew Smith, American basketball player (d. 2016)
  1990   – Jordan Tabor, English footballer (d. 2014)
1991 – Lauren Daigle, American contemporary Christian music singer and songwriter
  1991   – Hunter Hayes, American singer-songwriter and guitarist
  1991   – Oscar, Brazilian footballer
  1991   – Danilo Pereira, Bissauan-Portuguese footballer
1992 – Shannon Boyd, Australian rugby league player
  1992   – Damian McGinty, Northern Irish actor and singer
  1992   – Kristiāns Pelšs, Latvian ice hockey player (d. 2013)
1993 – Cameron Cullen, Australian rugby league player 
  1993   – Crazy Mary Dobson, American wrestler
  1993   – Ryōhei Katō, Japanese gymnast
  1993   – Sharon van Rouwendaal, Dutch swimmer
1994 – Clinton Gutherson, Australian rugby league player 
1997 – Billy Bainbridge, Australian rugby league player

Deaths
Pre-1600
 906 – Adalbert von Babenberg, Frankish nobleman
1000 – Olaf I, king of Norway
1031 – Gang Gam-chan, Korean general (b. 948)
1087 – William the Conqueror, English king (b. c.1028)
1191 – Conrad II, duke of Bohemia
1271 – Yaroslav of Tver, Russian Grand Prince (b. 1230)
1282 – Ingrid of Skänninge, Swedish abbess and saint
1285 – Kunigunda of Halych, queen regent of Bohemia (b. 1245)
1398 – James I, king of Cyprus (b. 1334)
1435 – Robert Harling, English knight
1438 – Edward, king of Portugal (b. 1391)
1487 – Chenghua, emperor of China (b. 1447)
1488 – Francis II, duke of Brittany (b. 1433)
1513 – James IV, king of Scotland (b. 1473)
  1513   – George Douglas, Scottish nobleman (b. 1469)
  1513   – William Douglas of Glenbervie, Scottish nobleman (b. 1473)
  1513   – William Graham, 1st Earl of Montrose, Scottish politician (b. 1464)
  1513   – George Hepburn, Scottish bishop
  1513   – Adam Hepburn, 2nd Earl of Bothwell, Scottish politician, Lord High Admiral of Scotland
  1513   – Adam Hepburn of Craggis, Scottish nobleman
  1513   – David Kennedy, 1st Earl of Cassilis, Scottish soldier (b. 1478)
  1513   – Alexander Lauder of Blyth, Scottish politician 
  1513   – Alexander Stewart, Scottish archbishop (b. 1493)
  1513   – Matthew Stewart, 2nd Earl of Lennox, Scottish politician (b. 1488)
1569 – Pieter Bruegel the Elder, Dutch painter (b. 1525)
1583 – Humphrey Gilbert, English explorer and politician (b. 1539)
1596 – Anna Jagiellon, Polish queen (b. 1523)

1601–1900
1603 – George Carey, 2nd Baron Hunsdon, English politician, Lord Lieutenant of Hampshire (b. 1547)
1611 – Eleanor de' Medici, Italian noblewoman (b. 1567)
1612 – Nakagawa Hidenari, Japanese daimyō (b. 1570)
1676 – Paul de Chomedey, Sieur de Maisonneuve, French soldier, founded Montreal (b. 1612)
1680 – Henry Marten, English lawyer and politician (b. 1602)
1703 – Charles de Saint-Évremond, French-English soldier, author, and critic (b. 1610)
1755 – Johann Lorenz von Mosheim, German historian and author (b. 1694)
1806 – William Paterson, Irish-American judge and politician, 2nd Governor of New Jersey (b. 1745)
1815 – John Singleton Copley, American-English colonial and painter (b. 1738)
1834 – James Weddell, Belgian-English sailor and navigator (b. 1787)
1841 – Augustin Pyramus de Candolle, Swiss botanist, mycologist, and academic (b. 1778)
1891 – Jules Grévy, French politician, 4th President of the French Republic (b. 1813)
1893 – Friedrich Traugott Kützing, German pharmacist, botanist and phycologist (b. 1807)
1898 – Stéphane Mallarmé, French poet and critic (b. 1842)
1901–present
1901 – Henri de Toulouse-Lautrec, French painter and illustrator (b. 1864)
1907 – Ernest Wilberforce, English bishop (b. 1840)
1909 – E. H. Harriman, American businessman and philanthropist (b. 1848)
1910 – Lloyd Wheaton Bowers, American lawyer and politician, United States Solicitor General (b. 1859)
1915 – Albert Spalding, American baseball player, manager, and businessman, co-founded Spalding (b. 1850)
1934 – Roger Fry, English painter and critic (b. 1866)
1941 – Hans Spemann, German embryologist and academic, Nobel Prize laureate (b. 1869)
1942 – Adele Kurzweil, Austrian Holocaust victim (b. 1925)
1943 – Carlo Bergamini, Italian admiral (b. 1888)
  1943   – Charles McLean Andrews, American historian, author, and academic (b. 1863)
1945 – Max Ehrmann, American poet and lawyer (b. 1872)
1950 – Victor Hémery, French racing driver (b. 1876)
1955 – Carl Friedberg, German pianist and educator (b. 1872)
1958 – Charlie Macartney, Australian cricketer and soldier (b. 1886)
1959 – Ramón Fonst, Cuban fencer (b. 1883)
1960 – Jussi Björling, Swedish tenor (b. 1911)
1963 – Edwin Linkomies, Finnish academic, professor and the Prime Minister of Finland (b. 1894)
1969 – Willy Mairesse, Belgian racing driver (b. 1928)
1975 – Johannes Brenner, Estonian footballer (b. 1906)
  1975   – John McGiver, American actor (b. 1913)
1976 – Mao Zedong, Chinese philosopher, academic, and politician, 1st Chairman of the Chinese Communist Party (b. 1893)
1978 – Hugh MacDiarmid, Scottish linguist, poet, and author (b. 1892)
  1978   – Jack L. Warner, Canadian-American production manager and producer, co-founded Warner Bros. (b. 1892)
1979 – Norrie Paramor, English composer, conductor, and producer (b. 1914)
1980 – John Howard Griffin, American journalist and author (b. 1920)
1981 – Robert Askin, Australian sergeant and politician, 32nd Premier of New South Wales (b. 1907)
  1981   – Jacques Lacan, French psychoanalyst and psychiatrist (b. 1901)
1985 – Neil Davis, Australian photographer and journalist (b. 1934)
  1985   – Paul Flory, American chemist and engineer, Nobel Prize laureate (b. 1910)
  1985   – Antonino Votto, Italian conductor (b. 1896)
1986 – Magda Tagliaferro, Brazilian pianist and educator (b. 1893)
1990 – Nicola Abbagnano, Italian philosopher and academic (b. 1901)
  1990   – Samuel Doe, Liberian field marshal and politician, 21st President of Liberia (b. 1951)
  1990   – Alexander Men, Russian priest and scholar (b. 1930)
1993 – Larry Noble, English comedian and actor (b. 1914)
  1993   – Helen O'Connell, American singer (b. 1920)
1994 – Patrick O'Neal, American actor (b. 1927)
1996 – Bill Monroe, American singer-songwriter (b. 1911)
1997 – Richie Ashburn, American baseball player and sportscaster (b. 1927)
  1997   – John Hackett, Australian-English general and author (b. 1910)
  1997   – Burgess Meredith, American actor, director, and producer (b. 1907)
1998 – Lucio Battisti, Italian singer-songwriter and guitarist (b. 1943)
  1998   – Bill Cratty, American dancer and choreographer (b. 1951)
1999 – Arie de Vroet, Dutch footballer and manager (b. 1918)
  1999   – Catfish Hunter, American baseball player (b. 1946)
  1999   – Ruth Roman, American actress (b. 1922)
2000 – Julian Critchley, English lawyer and politician (b. 1930)
2001 – Ahmad Shah Massoud, Afghan commander and politician, Afghan Minister of Defense (b. 1953)
2003 – Edward Teller, Hungarian-American physicist and academic (b. 1908)
  2003   – Don Willesee, Australian telegraphist and politician, 29th Australian Minister for Foreign Affairs (b. 1916)
2004 – Ernie Ball, American guitarist and businessman (b. 1930)
  2004   – Caitlin Clarke, American actress (b. 1952)
2006 – Gérard Brach, French director and screenwriter (b. 1927)
  2006   – Richard Burmer, American composer and engineer (b. 1955)
  2006   – Matt Gadsby, English footballer (b. 1979)
  2006   – William Bernard Ziff Jr., American businessman, founded Ziff Davis (b. 1930)
2012 – Verghese Kurien, Indian engineer and businessman, founded Amul (b. 1921)
  2012   – John McCarthy, Australian footballer (b. 1989)
  2012   – Mike Scarry, American football player and coach (b. 1920)
  2012   – Ron Tindall, English footballer and manager (b. 1935)
2013 – Sunila Abeysekera, Sri Lankan scholar and activist (b. 1952)
  2013   – Alberto Bevilacqua, Italian director and screenwriter (b. 1934)
  2013   – Saul Landau, American journalist, director, and author (b. 1936)
2014 – Montserrat Abelló i Soler, Spanish poet and translator (b. 1918)
  2014   – Firoza Begum, Bangladeshi singer (b. 1930)
  2014   – Graham Joyce, English author and educator (b. 1954)
2015 – Annemarie Bostroem, German poet, playwright, and songwriter (b. 1922)
  2015   – Einar H. Ingman Jr., American sergeant, Medal of Honor recipient (b. 1929)
  2015   – K. Kunaratnam, Sri Lankan physicist and academic (b. 1934)

Holidays and observances
Christian feast day:
Charles Lowder (Church of England)
Ciarán of Clonmacnoise
Constance, Nun, and her Companions (Episcopal Church)
Our Lady of Arantzazu (Oñati)
Peter Claver
Synaxis of Ss. Joachim and Anna, an Afterfeast. (Eastern Orthodox and Eastern Catholic Churches)
September 9 (Eastern Orthodox liturgics)
Armored Forces Day (Ukraine)
California Admission Day (California, United States)
Children's Day (Costa Rica)
Chrysanthemum Day or Kiku no Sekku'' (Japan)
Day of the Victims of Holocaust and of Racial Violence (Slovakia)
Emergency Services Day (United Kingdom)
Independence Day or Republic Day, celebrates the proclamation of Democratic People's Republic of Korea (North Korea) in 1948.
Independence Day (Tajikistan), celebrates the independence of Tajikistan from USSR in 1991.
Martyrs' Day (Afghanistan) (date may fall on September 8, follows a non-Gregorian calendar, see List of observances set by the Solar Hijri calendar)
Remembrance for Herman the Cheruscan (The Troth)

References

External links

 
 
 

Days of the year
September